Harmonic progression may refer to:

 Chord progression in music
 Harmonic progression (mathematics)
 Sequence (music)